Artur Stanislavovich Ershov (born 7 March 1990) is a Russian professional racing cyclist, who currently rides for UCI Track Team Marathon–Tula. He rode at the 2015 UCI Track Cycling World Championships. He was named in the start list for the 2016 Giro d'Italia.

Major results

2008
 6th Road race, UCI Juniors World Championships
 6th Time trial, UEC European Junior Road Championships
2011
 2nd Time trial, National Under-23 Road Championships
2012
 1st  Team pursuit, UEC European Track Championships
 9th Memorial Oleg Dyachenko
 10th Overall Tour of Qinghai Lake
1st Stage 8
2013
 10th Trofeo Palma
2014
 1st  Overall Grand Prix Udmurtskaya Pravda
1st Stage 4
 3rd Road race, National Road Championships
2015
 1st  Points race, UCI Track World Championships
 4th Overall Tour of Kuban
2016
 1st Stage 1b (TTT) Settimana Internazionale di Coppi e Bartali
2018
 1st Stage 3 Vuelta Ciclista a Costa Rica
 3rd Overall Five Rings of Moscow
2020
 1st  Overall Tour of Mevlana
 8th Grand Prix Velo Erciyes
 8th Grand Prix Central Anatolia

Grand Tour general classification results timeline

References

External links

1990 births
Living people
Russian male cyclists
Cyclists from Moscow
UCI Track Cycling World Champions (men)
Universiade medalists in cycling
Russian track cyclists
Universiade silver medalists for Russia
Medalists at the 2011 Summer Universiade